This is a list of mayors of Grenchen, Switzerland. The Stadtpräsident (earlier: Stadtammann) chairs the Gemeinderat, the executive of Grenchen/Granges.

References 
 Stadtarchiv Grenchen (Ed.): "100 Jahre sozialdemokratische Stadtammänner in Grenchen. Festschrift zum 100-Jahre-Jubiläum". Grenchen 1999.
 Werner Strub: "Grenchner Heimatbuch". Grenchen 1949.

Grenchen
Mayors of Grenchen, List
Grenchen
Lists of mayors (complete 1900-2013)